Magic, Music and Mayhem was the name of a fireworks display held as part of Mickey's Pirate and Princess Party hard ticket event at the Walt Disney World Resort's Magic Kingdom near Orlando, Florida.  This fireworks show is shown in place of the regular Wishes display during the event.

In June 2010, the show replaced Wishes during regular park hours as part of the Summer Nightastic! promotion, titled Summer Nightastic Firework Spectacular! 

Hosted by the Fairy Godmother of Cinderella with the three good fairies Flora, Fauna and Merryweather from Sleeping Beauty, along with the traditional appearance of Peter Pan's resident pixie Tinker Bell, the show features music from several Disney movies including  The Little Mermaid and Beauty and the Beast, but an invasion of pirates led by Peter Pan villain Captain Hook wreaks havoc with music from the Pirates of the Caribbean theme park attraction and feature films (including "The Black Pearl" and "He's A Pirate") until the fairies, with help from King Triton, Ariel's father and Sebastian stave off the rebellion by the buccaneers and peace is finally restore of it.The finale features fireworks that change from blue to pink at the request of the Fairy Godmother to settle the argument of Flora and Merrywether's continuing dispute since the finale of Sleeping Beauty. Note that during the Summer Nightastic Promotion, King Triton and Sebastian are not featured. The Under the Sea portion of the show is now introduced by the Fairy Godmother. Also during this time, the Fairy Godmother's opening spell and some of Captain Hook's dialogue have changed to reflect the promotion.

The soundtrack of this program, along with the "Disney Adventures Enchanted Parade" as well as those in Mickey's Not-So-Scary Halloween Party is available on an in-park CD entitled Magic Kingdom Event Party Music as of 2008.

Voices
 Fairy Godmother/Fauna - Russi Taylor
 Flora - Susan Blakeslee
 Merryweather - Tress MacNeille
 King Triton - Kenneth Mars
 Sebastian - Kevin Michael Richardson
 Captain Hook - Corey Burton

Soundtrack
All songs are instrumentals except for the reprise of "A Dream Is a Wish Your Heart Makes". Music arranged by Gordon Goodwin.
 Cinderella medley: "Bibbidi-Bobbidi-Boo",  "A Dream Is a Wish Your Heart Makes" and 'So This Is Love" - from the 1950 film (Mack David, Al Hoffman and Jerry Livingston)
 "Beauty and The Beast" (from the 1991 movie of same title) (Alan Menken)
 "Once Upon A Dream" - Sleeping Beauty (Pyotr Ilyich Tchaikovsky from the ballet of the same name; adapted by George Bruns)
 "So This Is Love" (reprise)
 "King Triton's Fanfare/Part of Your World" (The Little Mermaid) (Menken)
 "The Black Pearl" (Pirates of the Caribbean: The Curse of the Black Pearl) (Klaus Badelt composer, Hans Zimmer arranger)
 "He's A Pirate" (Pirates of the Caribbean film series) (Klaus Badelt composer, Hans Zimmer arranger)
 "A Dream Is a Wish Your Heart Makes" (reprise with chorus singing)

Magic Kingdom
Walt Disney Parks and Resorts fireworks
Former Walt Disney Parks and Resorts attractions